Who's That Flying?! is a shooter game developed by Mediatonic and Beeline Interactive for PlayStation Portable in 2010, and for Microsoft Windows and iOS in 2011.

Reception

The game received "generally favorable reviews" on all platforms according to the review aggregation website Metacritic.

References

External links
 

2010 video games
IOS games
PlayStation Portable games
Shooter video games
Sony Interactive Entertainment games
Video games developed in the United Kingdom
Windows games
Single-player video games